The Philippine Taekwondo Association (PTA) seeks to promote, advance and is the national governing body for taekwondo in the Philippines. The sports body is a member of the World Taekwondo Federation and Philippine Olympic Committee. The PTA was established in 1976. The PTA connects various taekwondo associations and acts as the governing body for representation to international taekwondo competition and conducts taekwondo belt promotion exams and instructor seminars.

On Feb. 28, 2021, the PTA conferred upon Technology Secretary Gregorio Honasan and Undersecretary Arnold Atienza with a Fifth Dan Blackbelt.

See also
 Taekwondo in the Philippines

References

External links
 Official website
 Philippine Taekwondo Association profile at the Philippine Olympic Committee website
 Philippine Taekwondo Association profile at the World Taekwondo Federation website
 

National members of the Asian Taekwondo Union
Taekwondo in the Philippines
Taekwondo
Taekwondo organizations
National Taekwondo teams